Åsa-Nisse on Holiday (Swedish: Åsa-Nisse på semester) is a 1953 Swedish comedy film directed by Ragnar Frisk and starring John Elfström, Artur Rolén and Helga Brofeldt. It was part of a long-running series of films featuring the title character Åsa-Nisse.

The film's sets were designed by the art director Bertil Duroj.

Cast
 John Elfström as Åsa-Nisse  
 Artur Rolén as Klabbarparn 
 Helga Brofeldt as Eulalia  
 Mona Geijer-Falkner as Kristin  
 Gustaf Lövås as Sjökvist  
 Erna Groth as Doris  
 Julia Cæsar as Klöverhage's aunt  
 John Botvid as Attendant 
 Dagmar Olsson as Speaker  
 Willy Peters as Klöverhage  
 Bertil Boo as Bertil Boo  
 Josua Bengtson as Jönsson 
 Wiktor Andersson as Knohultarn  
 Lennart Lundh as Kirre, con-artist  
 Ragnar Klange as Vicar  
 Bellan Roos as Shop customer 
 Pia Lundman as Girl at party 
 Iréne Gleston as Girl at party  
 Stig Johanson as Ticket collector  
 Alf Östlund as Man on the train

References

Bibliography 
 Gunnar Iverson, Astrid Soderbergh Widding & Tytti Soila. Nordic National Cinemas. Routledge, 2005.

External links 
 

1953 films
1953 comedy films
Swedish comedy films
1950s Swedish-language films
Films directed by Ragnar Frisk
Swedish black-and-white films
1950s Swedish films